Pristavlja Vas is a small settlement west of Šentvid pri Stični in the Municipality of Ivančna Gorica in central Slovenia. The area is part of the historical region of Lower Carniola. The municipality is now included in the Central Slovenia Statistical Region. 

A small roadside chapel-shrine in the southern part of the settlement is dedicated to the Holy Family and was built in the late 19th century.

References

External links
Pristavlja Vas on Geopedia

Populated places in the Municipality of Ivančna Gorica